C'est la Vie! is a 2017 French comedy film written and directed by Éric Toledano & Olivier Nakache. It was screened in the Gala Presentations section at the 2017 Toronto International Film Festival.

Plot
Wedding planner/caterer Max is staging a wedding at a 17th-century chateau, in the course of which he must deal with a volatile, often foul-mouthed assistant, missing staff, incompetent waiters, a demanding, egocentric groom, iffy electrical system, a rebellious substitute DJ, and a whole lot more.

Interwoven with his professional woes are his personal ones. He is on a trial separation from his wife and his French grammarian brother-in-law, who is also one of his waiters, is a former admirer of the bride. Max's other assistant is his mistress, who threatens to end their relationship and starts hitting on one of the waiters to prove it. And it's Max's birthday.

At the end of a string of safely negotiated disasters a runaway fireworks display and a crashed electrical system at the height of the event finally make him give up in despair and walk away... only to discover that his staff have surmounted the obstacles to create an outstanding, one-of-a-kind wedding celebration, Le sens de la fête: the meaning of the party.

Cast
 Jean-Pierre Bacri as Max
 Jean-Paul Rouve as Guy
 Gilles Lellouche as James
 Vincent Macaigne as Julien
 Eye Haïdara as Adèle
 Suzanne Clément as Josiane
 Alban Ivanov as Samy
 Hélène Vincent as Geneviève
 Benjamin Lavernhe as Pierre
 Judith Chemla as Héléna
 William Lebghil as Seb
 Kévin Azaïs as Patrice
 Antoine Chappey as Henri

Reception
On review aggregator website Rotten Tomatoes, the film has an approval rating of 81% based on 36 reviews, and an average rating of 6.9/10.

References

External links
 

2017 films
2017 comedy films
French comedy films
2010s French-language films
Films directed by Olivier Nakache and Éric Toledano
2010s French films